The Prasinodermophyta are a proposed basal Viridiplantae clade, as sister of another clade comprising the Chlorophyta and the Streptophyta. It consists of the Prasinodermophyceae and the Palmophyllophyceae. They were previously considered to be a basal Chlorophyta clade, or part of the "Prasinophytes".

References

Plant unranked clades